Aurahi (Nepali: औरही ) is a municipality in Mahottari District in Madhesh Province of Nepal. It was formed in 2016 occupying current 9 sections (wards) from previous 9 former VDCs. It occupies an area of 35.73 sq. km with a total population of 31,751.

References 

Populated places in Mahottari District
Nepal municipalities established in 2017
Municipalities in Madhesh Province